Uông Bí station is a railway station in Vietnam. It serves the town of Uông Bí, in Quảng Ninh Province.The trains that run there connect Uông Bí to the city of Haiphong. 

Buildings and structures in Quảng Ninh province
Railway stations in Vietnam